

Medal winners in Spain men's national basketball team 
Full list of the 92 medal winners while playing in Spain men's national basketball team since 1935: Olympics, World Cups and EuroBaskets.

Note: updated to EuroBasket 2022

See also 
 Spain national basketball team
 Spanish Basketball Federation
 Spain national youth basketball teams
 Basketball at the Summer Olympics
 FIBA Basketball World Cup
 FIBA EuroBasket

References

External links 
 FIBA Europe official website
 Official website
 Spanish Basketball Federation website
 FIBA profile
 EuroBasket.com profile

Spain national basketball team
Basketball statistics